Harold Anderson (1894–1973) was an American artist and illustrator.

Life 
Anderson studied at Fenway Art School in Boston, Massachusetts and was one of the country's most well known and respected character artists. He was recognized for his assistance to younger artists and illustrators.

He resided and worked in the Manhattan suburb of New Rochelle , a well known artist colony and home to many of the top commercial illustrators of the day such as Frank and J. C. Leyendecker and Norman Rockwell.

Also in residence were Al Parker, Mead Schaeffer and Dean Cornwell, who, along with Tom Lovell, N. C. Wyeth and Harold von Schmidt would become leaders in the field.

References

American magazine illustrators
Artists from New Rochelle, New York
1890s births
1973 deaths
20th-century American painters
American male painters
20th-century American male artists